Belluno is a town and province in the Veneto region of northern Italy. With its roughly 36,000 inhabitants, it is the largest populated area of Valbelluna. It is one of the 15 municipalities of the Dolomiti Bellunesi National Park.

Geography 
The ancient city of Belluno rises above a cliff spur near the confluence of the Torrente Ardo and the Piave River. To the north is the imposing Schiara range of the Dolomites, with the famous Gusela del Vescovà (Bishopric's needle), and Mounts Serva and Talvena rising above the city. To the south, the Venetian Prealps separate Belluno from the Venetian plain. Also to the south is the Nevegal, in the Castionese area, a skiing resort.

History 
The name of the city is derived from Celtic belo-dunum which means "splendid hill." The name was inspired by its favorable position within the valley.

It is conjectured that the population of the area that became Belluno was largely Venetic with a strong Celtic minority. However, as the Romans expanded northward into the Alps, the Celtic either emigrated or were absorbed. The people of the area swore friendship to Rome in the 225 BC conflict with the Gauls and again during the invasion by Hannibal in the Second Punic War. 
 
Founded perhaps around 220-200 BC the initial influence of Rome was military and commercial. Strategically located, the town protected cities to the south.  Belluno also became a supplier of iron and copper. Already within the Roman sphere of influence, the town was juridically and politically incorporated into the Roman Republic by the second century BC.

Sometime between the death of Julius Caesar and the ascent of Augustus, Bellunum became a Roman municipium and its people were ascribed to the Roman tribe Papiria. The town was ruled by quattorviri juri dicendo, by quattorviri aedilicia potestate, and by a Council of Elders. Under Augustus, it became part of Regio X Venetia et Histria. Among its citizens were Caius Flavius Hostilius and his wife Domitia, whose 3rd century sarcophagus lies next to the church of San Stefano.

After the fall of the Western Roman Empire, it was ruled by the Lombards (6th century) and the Carolingians (8th century); the famous Belluno Treasure in the British Museum dates from this period. From the late 9th century it was ruled by a count-bishop and it received a castle and a line of walls. Later it was a possession of the Ghibelline family of the Ezzelino. After having long contended the nearby territory with Treviso, in the end Belluno gave itself to the Republic of Venice (1404). The city was thenceforth an important hub for the transport of lumber from the Cadore through the Piave river. It remained Venetian until 1797. 

After the fall of the Venetian Republic, Belluno was an Austrian possession, until it was annexed to the Kingdom of Italy in 1866.

The cathedral was severely damaged by the earthquake of 1873, which destroyed a considerable portion of the town, though the campanile stood firm.

Main sights 
 The Duomo (Cathedral, 16th century), with the 18th-century bell tower designed by Filippo Juvarra. The church's plan is attributed to the Venetian architect Tullio Lombardo
 Palazzo dei Rettori (1491)
 The red edifice of the Communal Palace
 The Bishop's Palace, erected in 1190 by the count-bishop Gerardo de' Taccoli
 The Fountain of Piazza del Duomo
 Baroque church of San Pietro (1326), originally in Gothic style. It includes five paintings by Andrea Schiavone, three by Sebastiano Ricci.
 Palazzo del Capitano
 The 16th-century church of San Rocco
 Santo Stefano church, housing several 15th-century paintings by local masters. It also includes an Adoration of the Magi, from Tiziano's workshop.
 The Romanesque church of San Biagio
 Porta Dojona and Porta Rugo: gates in the ancient walls
 Santa Maria dei Battuti: 16th-century church

Government

Frazioni 
Antole, Bes, Bolzano Bellunese, Caleipo-Sossai, Castion, Castoi, Cavessago, Cavarzano, Cet, Chiesurazza, Cirvoi, Col di Piana, Col di Salce, Collungo, Cusighe, Faverga, Fiammoi, Giamosa, Giazzoi, Levego, Madeago, Miér, Nevegal, Orzes, Pedeserva, Pra de Luni, Rivamaor, Safforze, Sala, Salce, San Pietro in Campo, Sargnano, Sois, Sopracroda, Sossai, Tassei, Tisoi, Vezzano, Vignole, Visome.

Quarters 
Baldenich, Borgo Garibaldi (or Via Garibaldi), Borgo Piave, Borgo Prà, Cavarzano, Lambioi, Mussoi, Quartier Cadore, San Lorenzo, San Pellegrino, San Francesco, Via Cairoli, Via Feltre-Maraga, Via Montegrappa.

Climate 
Belluno has a warm-summer humid continental climate (Köppen climate classification: Dfb).

Transport 
State roads lead from Belluno to Feltre, Treviso, Ponte nelle Alpi and Vittorio Veneto.

Belluno railway station, at Piazzale della Stazione, forms part of the Calalzo–Padua railway.  It was opened in 1912, replacing an earlier station opened in 1886.  Its passenger building, designed by the architect Roberto Narducci, was constructed in 1928.

The bus station is also at the Piazzale della Stazione, next to the railway station.

Notable residents 
 Marco Paolini (b. 1956), stage actor
 Dino Buzzati (1906–1972), novelist and journalist, born in Belluno
 Pope Gregory XVI (1765–1846)
 Andrea Brustolon (1662–1732), sculptor
 Ippolito Caffi (1809–1866), painter
 Sebastiano Ricci (1659–1734), painter
 Marco Ricci (1676–1730), painter
 Luigi Luca Cavalli-Sforza (1922–2018), human geneticist and pioneer of the Human Genome Diversity Project, resided and died in Belluno
 Pope John Paul I (1912–1978)
 Bernardino Vitulini, painter
 Charles DeRudio, Italian aristocrat and later American soldier who fought in the 7th U.S. Cavalry at the Battle of the Little Bighorn.

International relations 
 

Belluno is twinned with:
  Cervia, Italy
  Bend, United States

See also
 Province of Belluno
 Dolomiti Bellunesi National Park
 Roman Catholic Diocese of Belluno-Feltre

References

External links 

Bellunovirtuale
Adorable Belluno: official tourism website of Belluno

 
Cities and towns in Veneto
Territories of the Republic of Venice
Populated places established in the 3rd century BC